Hubert Johnston may refer to:
Hubert Johnston (cricketer), Scottish cricketer and solicitor
Hubert Johnston, owner of Wickland (Shelbyville, Kentucky)
Hubert Johnston, in 1952 NFL Draft

See also
Bert Johnston (disambiguation)
Hubert Johnson (disambiguation)